Sarah Kirkland Snider (born October 8, 1973) is an American composer. She has received critical acclaim for her chamber, orchestral, song cycle, choral, and ballet works.

Biography
Snider was born and raised in Princeton, New Jersey. Despite a non-musical parentage, she had a self-professed musical itch from a young age, going as far as to knock on her neighbors’ doors to play their pianos by ear. Eventually, Snider began formal music study, beginning piano at age 7 and cello at age 10. She also sang in choirs, attending five years of summer camp at the American Boychoir School where she studied under Anton Armstrong. She later attended Princeton High School, singing in a nationally celebrated high school choir under William Trego, and performing in the PHS Orchestra. She cites two female PHS Orchestra conductors as early female role models.

Snider also composed music at a young age, keeping it private until her junior year of high school when she showed her first works to her piano teacher, composer/pianist Laurie Altman, who encouraged her to study composition in college. Snider would later stylistically describe these early works as “somewhere between early Debussy and Joni Mitchell.”

Snider received a BA in Psychology-Sociology from Wesleyan University, where she decided not to pursue composition because she felt her music too conservative for its experimentally-oriented program. After graduating in 1995, she moved to New York and worked at a pro-choice law firm. While considering pursuing public interest law, she began writing music for experimental theater and decided to pursue composition full-time. Snider enrolled in the composition master's program at New York University to study with composer Justin Dello Joio, whom she called “a brilliant, Nadia Boulanger-style teacher,” but left after three semesters. In 2005 and 2006, she received a Master of Music and an Artist Diploma in Composition from the Yale School of Music, where she studied with Martin Bresnick, Aaron Jay Kernis, Ezra Laderman, and David Lang.

She is married to composer Steven Mackey.

Music 
Snider's musical compositions, particularly her song cycles, frequently borrow from indie rock and popular musical idioms as well as classical chamber music forms and instrumentation. These stylistic choices have led critics to label her music as part of the burgeoning indie-classical movement, where she has been called "perhaps the most sophisticated" of voices within this genre.

Snider has received particular recognition for her album releases of her classical song cycles and her Mass: Penelope (2010), Unremembered (2015), and Mass for the Endangered (2020).

Penelope (2010) 
Written for female voice and chamber orchestra, Penelope is an orchestral song cycle based on Homer's Odyssey, imagining the ancient Greek epic as told from the perspective of Odysseus's wife, Penelope. Penelope was originally conceived as a music-theater monodrama in 2007–2008, commissioned by the J. Paul Getty Center and scored for alto/actor and string quartet. Snider later expanded it to a song cycle, expanding and tailoring it to the unique talents of vocalist Shara Worden and the chamber orchestra Ensemble Signal, both of whom feature prominently in the reimagined work. Its lyrics were written by Ellen McLaughlin. 

New Amsterdam Records, who published the album on October 26, 2010, describes the work as follows:Inspired by Homer’s epic poem, the Odyssey, Penelope is a meditation on memory, identity, and what it means to come home. Suspended somewhere between art song, indie rock, and chamber folk, the music of Penelope moves organically from moments of elegiac strings-and-harp reflection to dusky post-rock textures with drums, guitars and electronics, all directed by a strong sense of melody and a craftsman’s approach to songwriting.The album received widespread critical acclaim and commercial success—as of 2020, the song cycle has been performed over fifty times in North America and Europe. Pitchfork's Jayson Greene described Penelope as “a gorgeous piece of music and hauntingly vivid psychological portrait.” Time Out New York named Penelope its “No. 1 Classical Album of 2010”, while NPR deemed the song cycle among its “Top Five Genre-Defying Albums of 2010.”

"The Lotus Eaters", the fourth song on the album, received particular attention. HuffPost named it one of the Top Ten Alternative Art Songs of 2001–2010, while NPR listed the track as among the "200 Greatest Songs Written by 21st Century Women" in 2018, eight years after its release.

Unremembered (2015) 
Snider’s sophomore album, Unremembered, is scored for seven voices, chamber orchestra, and electronics, an expanded scope from Penelope. Released September 4, 2015 on New Amsterdam Records, critics deemed the song cycle an overwhelming success—it appeared in over 20 year-end lists for Best Album, including “Top 5 Classical Albums of 2015” in The Washington Post.

Unremembered sets poetry by New York-based poet/writer Nathaniel Bellows, described as recalling "strange and beautiful happenings experienced during a childhood in rural Massachusetts." Shara Nova returns on vocals alongside singers Padma Newsome and DM Stith. Additionally, the album features the Unremembered Orchestra, a group of performers within New York City contemporary ensembles Alarm Will Sound, International Contemporary Ensemble, The Knights, and So Percussion), conducted by Edwin Outwater. The recording was co-produced by Snider with Lawson White and mixed by Grammy-winning producer Andrew Scheps, and made greater use of the multitracking and processing tools of the studio than did Penelope.

In 2017, vocalists Padma Newsome, Shara Nova, and DM Stith toured Unremembered in the U.S. and Europe with various orchestras and ensembles at venues including Knoxville’s Big Ears Festival (with The Knights), Liquid Music (with the St. Paul Chamber Orchestra), the SHIFT Festival (with North Carolina Symphony), and Holland’s Cross-linx Festival (with the Doelen Ensemble and Codarts Rotterdam).

Mass for the Endangered (2020) 
Snider’s first Mass and third album was commissioned by Trinity Church Wall Street, the renowned New York City sacred choral institution, and released on Nonesuch Records/New Amsterdam Records on September 25, 2020. Part of Trinity’s Mass Re-Imaginings project, the work is described as "a rumination on the concept of the traditional Catholic Mass, its fidelity enhanced by Snider’s interpolation of traditional Latin text for the Gloria, Sanctus/Benedictus, and parts of the Kyrie, Credo, and Agnus Dei." The six-movement work is written for SATB choir and twelve instruments.

Thematically, NPR critic Tom Huizenga wrote that though Mass for the Endangered uses a religious framework, it instead "focuses not on our relationship to God, but instead to the flora and fauna on our planet." Snider herself describes the Mass as embodying "a prayer for endangered animals and the imperiled environments in which they live." 

Snider received similarly lofty acclaim to her previous albums. Mass for the Endangered was among The Boston Globe’s "10 Reasons to Keep Falling for Classical Music" and appeared on numerous year-end lists including NPR and The Nation. Mass cemented Snider’s prominence among contemporary composers, with The New Yorker citing the composer’s "technical command and unerring knack for breathtaking beauty" and NPR proclaiming that "Snider must be recognized as one of today's most compelling composers for the human voice."

Recognition 
In part for the success of her three albums of large-scale works for voices and instruments, as well as her co-leadership of the label New Amsterdam Records, The Washington Post named Snider one of the Top 35 Female Composers in Classical Music in 2019. Elsewhere, she has been cited by critics as "a significant figure on the American music landscape", "an important representative of 21st century trends in composition," and "one of the decade’s more gifted, up-and-coming modern classical composers." 

Her music has been performed by the New York Philharmonic, San Francisco Symphony, National Symphony Orchestra, Detroit Symphony Orchestra, among others in venues including Carnegie Hall, Lincoln Center, Kennedy Center, the Elbphilharmonie, the Sydney Opera House, and Wigmore Hall.

Snider was Composer-in-Residence at UC-Boulder in 2018–19; she has also been Composer-in-Residence at Winnipeg New Music Festival, Soundstreams, the Bowling Green State University New Music Festival, the Great Lakes Chamber Music Festival, Nief-Norf Festival, Decoda Ensemble's Skidmore Chamber Music Institute, and the So Percussion Summer Institute. In 2014, Snider received the Elaine Lebenbom Award from the Detroit Symphony Orchestra, the only orchestra-sponsored award granted annually to a living female composer of any age or nationality.

List of works

Orchestra 

Disquiet (2005, rev. 2012)
 Until I Become Human (2006) for mezzo-soprano, solo viola, and orchestra
 Hiraeth (2015)
 Something for the Dark (2015)
 Blue Hour (2017) for mezzo-soprano and string orchestra
 Embrace (2018)
 Forward Into Light (2020)

Chamber ensemble 

 Just Once (1997) for soprano and piano
 Mad Song (1998) for tenor and piano
 The Heart of the Woman (1998) for soprano and piano
 The Ecotone (1999) for two pianos
 Ave (2002) for string quartet
 Stanzas in Meditation (2004) for two sopranos and harp
 In Two Worlds (2005) for flute, oboe, bass clarinet, French horn, offstage trumpet, trumpet, vibraphone, violin, and cello
 Thread and Fray (2006) for bass clarinet, viola, and marimba
 Chrysalis (2006) for soprano and two violas
 Shiner (2006) for trombone, harp, viola, and marimba
 Passenger Seat (2006) for high voice (soprano, mezzo, or countertenor) and piano
 How Graceful Some Things Are, Falling Apart (2006) for mezzo-soprano and piano
 Daughter of the Waves (2011) for flute, clarinet, French horn, trumpet, electric guitar, violin, viola, and cello
 Pale as Centuries (2011) for flute, clarinet, bass clarinet, electric guitar, piano, and double bass
 Taking Turns in My Skin (2011) flute/piccolo, clarinet/bass clarinet, French horn, trumpet, electric guitar, violin, viola, cello, and soprano (optional finger cymbals, guiro, vibraslap)
 Penelope (2012) for fl/alto fl/picc, cl/bass cl — French horn, tmpt — drums/perc (glock, egg shaker, BD, gro, tri, 2 crot., fing cymb) — e. gtr./acoustic gtr. — mezzo-soprano — violin, viola, cello — laptop
 You Are Free (2015) for flute, clarinet, marimba, piano, violin, and cello
 Chrysalis (arr. 2015) for soprano, violin and cello
 Unremembered (2013, arr. 2016) for chamber orchestra, three voices, and electronics
 Five Songs from Unremembered (arr. 2017) for oboe, English horns, percussion, acoustic/electric guitar, harp, piano, violin, cello — Wide-Ranged Soprano (E3 to B5) — laptop (electronics)
 Parallel Play (2019) for flute and piano
 If you bring forth what is within you: Suite from Blue Hour (2019) for flute, clarinet, bassoon, French horn, piano, two violins, viola, cello, and double bass
 Penelope (arr. 2019) for mezzo-soprano — one drums/perc (vibr., glock., egg shaker, BD, gro, tri, 2 crot.) — two violins, viola, cello, double bass — laptop
 O Virtus Sapientiae (2020) for soprano, and string quartet
 Caritas (2021) for soprano, harp, and string quartet
 Eighteen Million Six (2021) for soprano, tenor, and piano

Choir 

 Here (2011) for SSAA chorus
 Psalm of the Soil (2013) for five tenors, two baritones, and two basses (optional piano accompaniment)
 Ouroboros (2015) for SSA chorus, string quartet, and two percussion
 Mass for the Endangered (2018) for SATB chorus, piano, string quintet, flute, oboe, clarinet, bassoon, harp and percussion
 You Must Feel with Certainty (2018) for SATB chorus and percussion

Solo instrument 

 Finisterre (1997) for solo piano
 Only Five (1997) for solo piano
 Uninvited Reason (1998) for solo piano
 Prelude (1999) for solo piano
 A Single Breath (1999) for solo viola
 Ballade (2001) for solo piano
 The Reserved, The Reticent (2004) for solo cello
 The Currents (2012) for solo piano
 the plum tree I planted still there (2021) for solo piano

Musical theater 

 The Burning Out of ’82 (1997) for SATB quartet, piano, and cello

References

External links
Sarah Kirkland Snider Official Site
Penelope Official Site
New Amsterdam Records

Living people
People from Princeton, New Jersey
American women composers
Wesleyan University alumni
Classical musicians from New Jersey
Yale School of Music alumni
Pupils of Martin Bresnick
Pupils of Christopher Rouse (composer)
21st-century American composers
21st-century American women musicians
21st-century women composers
1973 births